Oven Is My Friend is a 7-inch EP by Sebadoh, released in 1991. It was limited to 1500 copies.

Track listing 
"Oven Is My Friend" (Church Police cover)
"Prove It"
"Cheapshot"
"Waxbag Maestro"
"Delicious Cakes"

References
Footnotes

External links

1991 EPs
Sebadoh EPs